Warradarge is a town in the Mid West region of Western Australia. Pronounced War-ra-darg-ee.

References 

Towns in Western Australia
Shire of Coorow